The German Environmental Prize is a government-sponsored award for protecting the environment. Worth €500,000, it is one of the most valuable environmental awards in Europe.

The sponsor German Federal Environmental Foundation (DBU) is based in Osnabrück; the prize has been awarded by the President of Germany since 1993. The prize is awarded for "commitment and achievements that make a decisive and exemplary contribution to the protection and preservation of our environment now and in the future".

Winners 
Source:

See also
List of environmental awards
List of prizes named after people

References

External links 
 

Environmental awards
German awards
Awards established in 1993